This is a list of diplomatic missions in El Salvador. There are 33 embassies in San Salvador.

Embassies
San Salvador

Other posts in San Salvador
 (Interest Section)
 (Delegation)

Gallery of embassies

Non-resident embassies

Located in Guatemala City

Located in Ottawa

Located in Havana

Located in Mexico City

Located in New York City

Located in San José, Costa Rica

Located in Managua

Located in Santiago

Located in Washington, D.C.

Former Embassies 
 
  (closed in 1979)

See also
 Foreign relations of El Salvador

References

 Ministry of Foreign Affairs of El Salvador 

List
El Salvador
Diplomatic missions